Iberulites are a particular type of microspherulites (Fig. 1) that develop in the atmosphere (troposphere), finally falling to the earth's surface. The name comes from the Iberian Peninsula where they were discovered.

Definition 

An iberulite is a co-association   with axial geometry, consisting of well-defined mineral grains, together with non-crystalline compounds, structured around a coarse-grained core with a smectite rind, only one vortex and pinkish color (Figs. 1-2), formed in the troposphere by complex aerosol-water-gas interactions.

Shape 

These microspherulites are mostly spherical in shape (roundness index=0.95), with 60-90 μm modal diameter, although some particles can be up to 200 μm in diameter. According to this roundness index, these microspherules are really elongated spheroids with two axes defined along a polar plane and typically presenting a depression or vortex. The presence of plant filaments in the atmosphere can distort these shapes and sizes. In any case, these are uncommon “giant” aerosol particles.

Compositional attributes 

Composition can be determined by both X-ray diffraction (XRD) and electronic microscopy techniques (mainly SEM, EDX, HRTEM). Sections show that the body of iberulites can be divided into core and rind. The core is mainly formed by grains of quartz, calcite, dolomite and feldspars. The rind shows clay minerals, mainly smectites (beidellite, montmorillonite) and illite, as well as sulfates, chlorides and amorphous silica. The latter group of minerals could be the result of neoformations during the maturation process occurring in the atmosphere during the final stages of iberulite formation. It is striking that sulphates only appear in the periphery of the iberulites. Flight over areas with anthropogenic or natural (volcanic, as those of North Atlantic archipelagos) sulphur emissions probably adsorbs SO2 onto the iberulite surface. Descent to the marine boundary layer (MBL)   of the Iberian-Moroccan Atlantic coast leads to the incorporation of sea salt and microorganisms. The iberulites eventually fall on the southern Iberian Peninsula, where they have been detected.

Formation

Geographical setting 

Iberulites have as yet only been found in the southern Iberian Peninsula. This location is geographically close to North Africa and it is therefore influenced by the emissions of Saharan aerosols, which are the greatest contributor of particulate matter to the atmospheric global dust budget 
 (Fig. 3).

Saharan dust outbreaks and iberulites 

The general content of aerosols in the atmosphere of the southern Iberian Peninsula is clearly related to the evolution of aerosols arriving from North Africa. Monitoring of dry aerosol deposition using passive samplers determined the formation of iberulites in two periods of the year (Fig. 4). The main depositional period occurs throughout the summer, while the second appears as a minor peak in early spring. However, the formation of iberulites is more specifically related with Saharan dust outbreaks, or dust plumes (Fig. 5) occurring within these two defined periods.

Iberulites and red rains 

Short episodes of wet deposition (more specifically red rains) were observed  during Saharan dust outbreaks over the period 2004-2013. Monitoring of these episodes led to the obtaining of a sequence of droplet impacts (Fig. 6) corresponding to June 6, 2012. This sequence would have begun with the formation of more or less aerosol-rich water droplets (or precursor water droplets ) (Fig. 6A). The aerosol contents, together with dissolved salts (detected in this sequence as whitish or shiny precipitates), would have gradually increased, finally producing a well-defined iberulite after desiccation (Fig. 6E).
The passage of these Saharan dust outbreaks over the study site had a total mean duration of five days (Fig. 7). It was observed during this passage that the central day presented the highest air temperatures and PM10 and PM2.5 (PM10>PM2.5) contents, whereas relative humidity decreased (RH). A relation was therefore established between monthly numbers of iberulite episodes and PM10 content-RH, which determined that clean atmospheres (<5 μg•m-3) with RH>65% do not present suitable conditions for iberulite formation.

Stages in the formation of iberulites 

Iberulites are linked to the evolution of high-dust air masses (plumes) which, originating in Saharan dust storms, are transported over the Iberian Peninsula and often across the eastern North Atlantic Ocean. These plumes occur in the warm season (May to September), as a result of anticyclone activity affecting the Iberian Peninsula, and only sporadically in spring.
Based on the relation between iberulites and red rain events, as well as the morphologies and compositional attributes observed, an aqueous interphase hypothesis has been suggested as the unitary mechanism for tropospheric formation of iberulites.
Interactions between water droplets and Saharan aerosols create complex hydrodynamic conditions  causing the possibility of collisions (wake capture and front capture)  that originate the "precursor water droplets" of the iberulites. 
The movement of these water droplets to lower tropospheric levels implies either simultaneous or consecutive processes such as coalescence, formation of vortex and downdraught. During this phase the iberulites acquire their spherical shape and internal structure (core and rind), although sometimes this shape can be distorted.

There is an additional process of atmospheric maturation of iberulites that, in detail, only happens on the smectite rind, by means of heterogeneous and multiphase reactions  producing sulfates as the result of H2SO4 attack on the minerals of the rind. This would lead to the rapid transformation of some primary minerals into products of atmospheric neoformation  secondary minerals): the sulfates (mainly the gypsum) would be the product of H2SO4 attack on the interlayer cations of the smectites, which would gradually destroy the octahedral and tetrahedral  sheets of phyllosilicates creating mixed sulfates.

The alunite - jarosite found in the smectite rind would have a similar origin. If acid attack progresses further, the phyllosilicate grains would be completely destroyed, producing amorphous silica and releasing iron. Since biogenic exoskeletons have no signs of corrosion, they must have been incorporated after the acid attack described above, probably simultaneously with the incorporation of sea salt.

See also 

Aerosol
Dust storm
Mineral dust
Plume
Red rain in Kerala
Saharan Air Layer
Troposphere

Notes

References

External links

Mineralogy
Atmospheric sciences